Neha Sharad is an Indian television actor and poet. She has worked in TV shows, including Tara, Waqt ki Raftar, Mamta, Gumraah, Yeh Duniya Ghazab Ki and Farmaan.

Life
Neha was born in Bhopal and grew up in Bombay. She is a daughter of writer Padma Shri Sharad Joshi and theatre artist Irfana Siddiqui. She was involved in the 2009 TV series, Lapataganj, as a creative head, as the initial episodes were based on her father's works.

She has organized literary festivals, such as Sharadotsav, to commemorate her father's works.

References

External links
 

Indian television actresses
Living people
Actresses from Mumbai
1970 births